Triton is malware first discovered  at a Saudi Arabian petrochemical plant in 2017. It can disable safety instrumented systems, which can then contribute to a plant disaster. It has been called "the world's most murderous malware."

In December 2017, it was reported that the safety systems of an unidentified power station, believed to be in Saudi Arabia, were compromised when the Triconex industrial safety technology made by Schneider Electric SE was targeted in what is believed to have been a state sponsored attack. The computer security company Symantec claimed that the malware, known as "Triton", exploited a vulnerability in computers running the Microsoft Windows operating system.

In 2018, FireEye, a company that researches cyber-security, reported that the malware most likely came from the Central Scientific Research Institute of Chemistry and Mechanics (CNIIHM), a research entity in Russia.

See also 
 Advanced persistent threat
 Cyber electronic warfare
 Cyber security standards
 Cyberattack
 Cyberterrorism
 Stuxnet

References 

Windows trojans
Cyberattacks on energy sector
Malware targeting industrial control systems